Adrián Rodríguez Moya (born 28 November 1988) is a Spanish actor and singer. He is perhaps the best known for his roles in television series Los Serrano and Física o Química, and as a former member of Santa Justa Klan.

Biography 
Rodríguez was born on 28 November 1988 in the town of Cornellà de Llobregat near Barcelona. He is the son of Antonio Rodíguez and Ana Moya.

Career 
He made his acting debut as DVD in Telecinco television series Los Serrano in 2005. While working on Los Serrano, he formed the band Santa Justa Klan alongside his co–stars Víctor Elías, Natalia Sánchez and Andrés de la Cruz. Santa Justa Klan released two Platinum certificated albums, SJK in 2005 and DPM in 2006. Rodríguez then made a brief appearances in 2007 film El vuelo del guirre. In 2008 he began working on his debut album, releasing hip hop singles "Si empieza a llover", "La distancia", "Vidas diferentes" and "Ready".

In 2009 Rodríguez began working on the Antena 3 television series Física o Química as David, a teenager who hides that he is a homosexual before coming out of the closet. The show focuses on teenage issues such as addictions, anorexia and sexual orientation. The series has attracted a lot of polemics. Rodríguez's co–star Javier Calvo stated the themes of the series are "problems that are also present in reality".
Award, best actor at "Grand Prix Corallo Città di Alghero" 9 July 2011.
On 29 June 2012 Adrián Rodríguez has made his musical debut in the beautiful Italian Tuscan Versilia proving a huge success and on this occasion brought his new musical work for the summer of 2012, which was appreciated by all fans present. There will be soon in Italy dates and other events with this artist who has confirmed sapute addition to television acting skills to have a stamp of singing voice and a personality not common in the international music scene.

Filmography

Discography

Santa Justa Klan

Solo

References

External links 
 Adrián Rodríguez at the Internet Movie Database 
 Adrián Rodríguez at the Internet Movie Database 

1988 births
Male television actors from Catalonia
Living people
People from Cornellà de Llobregat
Male film actors from Catalonia
Singers from Catalonia
Spanish male television actors
21st-century Spanish singers
21st-century Spanish male singers
21st-century Spanish male actors